Plastique is a supervillain appearing in American comic books published by DC Comics. She is an enemy of Firestorm and both an enemy and love interest of Captain Atom.

Publication history
Plastique first appeared in The Fury of Firestorm #7 (December 1982) and was created by Gerry Conway and Pat Broderick.

Fictional character biography
Bette Sans Souci was introduced as a terrorist attempting to coerce the separation of Quebec from the rest of Canada. First appearing in The Fury of Firestorm #7 (December 1982), she subsequently made several appearances during Conway's tenure as writer of that series. She then began appearing in DC Comics' first Captain Atom series from 1986 onwards, at first depicted as an adversary, though that relationship eventually evolved toward the romantic.

Firestorm

In her first appearance, Plastique attempted a bombing against the New York Herald-Express (a fictitious newspaper appearing within the DC Universe) using a set of bombs attached to her costume, only to have Firestorm disarm her by vaporising her clothing, leaving her naked and humiliated in public while Firestorm took the bombs to explode in a safer area. Later, via genetic engineering, she gained the power to project explosive force outward from her body.

Her last major public operation as a terrorist was depicted in her first Captain Atom appearance, wherein she attempted to destroy the Canadian Parliament Building in Ottawa and the Statue of Liberty in New York City, as well as attempting to assassinate the President of the United States and the Canadian Prime Minister. Her plans were thwarted, and Plastique herself was captured by Captain Atom.

Suicide Squad

She became a member of the Suicide Squad for the duration of a single mission. She attempted to betray the team during their second field operation in Qurac (under the command of Amanda Waller), but it was anticipated and Plastique was caught by fellow operative Nemesis and subsequently brainwashed to suppress all memories of her membership in the Squad. Her followers eventually abandoned her after becoming disillusioned with the use of force and violence to advance their shared cause (thus reflecting real-world Canadian politics by that point, which had long since moved past the era that Plastique's methods and policies reflected). Plastique became a mercenary.

Eventually she reformed, subsequently earning a pardon from the U.S. government for her crimes there based on services rendered to the Captain Atom Project, as well as a somewhat more subdued response along similar lines from the Canadian authorities.

Marriage

Plastique then became engaged to Captain Atom, although the engagement was effectively broken in the wake of events of Armageddon: 2001. Following his reappearance in the then-present day, the engagement was renewed. Plastique was invited into the ranks of the Extreme Justice faction of the Justice League. She celebrated a bachelorette party before the Extreme Justice title was cancelled in 1996.

The wedding was notable for its non-depiction within the comics themselves, having been implied in the miniseries The L.A.W. as having taken place sometime between the cancellation of Extreme Justice and the start of The L.A.W.'''s first issue. Plastique has made a handful of appearances since then, mostly cameos in other series. It has, however, been confirmed during the Captain Atom: Armageddon events, in which Captain Atom states that their marriage had been really short, doomed from the start from irreconcilable differences, mostly about political views, between them.

One Year Later
One year after the events of Infinite Crisis, in Justice League of America (vol. 2) #1, Signalman informs Black Lightning that Plastique has teamed with the Electrocutioner in a partnership known as the Bomb Squad. Since then she has appeared in Checkmate (1st series) as a member of the Suicide Squad. Apparently, she and Captain Atom are now separated, leading the character to revert to her criminal ways.

During the 34th week of the series 52, Plastique and the Electrocutioner appeared as part of a Suicide Squad operation against Black Adam. She later appeared in Checkmate (2nd series), again depicted as a villain. In Countdown, she appears with the Suicide Squad to help apprehend the Trickster and the Pied Piper.

It is recently shown that Plastique helped Prometheus in his plot to get revenge on the Justice League by planting a massive explosive device in Fawcett City. While trying to flee the country with several companions, the group is ambushed by Batman and the new Justice League. Plastique tries to escape, but is defeated and captured by Congorilla.

The New 52
In The New 52, Plastique is reintroduced at the start of the "Trinity War" storyline, where she is a member of the Secret Society of Super Villains and attempts to assassinate Madame Xanadu. She later infiltrates A.R.G.U.S. to plant a bomb on Doctor Light's body.

During the "Forever Evil" storyline, the Crime Syndicate sends Plastique, Black Bison, Hyena, Multiplex and Typhoon to attack the hospital to finish Gorilla Grodd's work in Central City.

Futures End
In 2020, Plastique is working as a thief and mercenary. She crosses paths with Batman (Terry McGinnis), who has traveled back in time to stop a robot apocalypse. Caught in his time wake is a cybernetically converted Plastique. After killing the cyborg, McGinnis is forced to bring her body with him so the future technology will not fall into anyone's hands. Plastique finds the body, causing her to freak out, fight alongside the heroes, and becomes romantically involved with McGinnis.

Powers and abilities
Originally Plastique wore a costume covered with plastic explosives, which she could trigger and detonate manually. She has since gained the ability to project explosive force at will by touching an object with her fingertips.

In other media
Television
 Plastique appears in the Justice League Unlimited episode "Task Force X", voiced by Juliet Landau. This version is an explosives and demolition expert who can conceal explosives in her suit. She is recruited by Project Cadmus' Task Force X to steal the Annihilator automaton from the Justice League's Watchtower. While the group succeeds, Plastique is abandoned after being caught in the explosion of one of her devices and left severely wounded, though Captain Atom attends to her injuries.
 Plastique appears in Smallville, portrayed by Jessica Parker Kennedy. This version is a metahuman capable of detonating any object around her via explosive beams fired from her eyes who was kidnapped by LuthorCorp as a child and held prisoner for three years before she escaped and went on the run to escape from LuthorCorp employees. In her self-titled episode, Plastique is discovered by Chloe Sullivan and attempts to kill her, only to be defeated by Clark Kent and arrested by the authorities. While awaiting transport to Belle Reve, Plastique is recruited by Tess Mercer's group. In the episode "Injustice", Plastique joins the group in searching for Davis Bloome. After two of their members are killed, the survivors go rogue, but are defeated by Kent and Green Arrow. In the episode "Shield", Plastique is recruited into the Suicide Squad and helps them break Deadshot out of prison.
 Bette Sans Souci appears in The Flash episode "Plastique", portrayed by Kelly Frye. This version is an EOD specialist for the U.S. Army who lacks villainous tendencies. After being wounded by a bomb in Afghanistan, she was brought to Central City for treatment. While there, she was exposed to dark matter from the explosion of S.T.A.R. Labs' particle accelerator, which fused her with the bomb's shrapnel at the cellular level and turned her into a metahuman capable of detonating anything she touches, though she lacks control over this. While on the run from General Wade Eiling, who intends to weaponize her, Souci encounters the Flash and his allies, who create special gloves that negate her abilities. They intend to recruit her into their group, but Harrison Wells secretly convinces her to kill the relentless Eiling. She makes an attempt on his life, but is fatally shot, forcing the Flash to run her into the Central City river to prevent her from detonating in the city.
 Plastique makes a brief appearance in the Harley Quinn season three premiere "Harlivy", voiced by Kari Wahlgren. This version is a minor member of the Suicide Squad. After being kidnapped by Harley Quinn and Poison Ivy, Amanda Waller calls in Plastique to successfully buy her time to escape. After being restrained by Ivy, Plastique commits suicide via one of her explosives.

Video games
Plastique appears as a playable DLC character in Lego Batman 3: Beyond Gotham.

Reception
The character of Plastique has been portrayed in diverse ways in its various appearances: considered "a classic DC villainess" by Tierney Bricker, "she has flirted with good on occasion". Reviewers Scott Von Doviak, Brianna Reeves and Felix Böhme found Plastique’s appearance in The Flash TV series interesting and nuanced, both in comparison to other representations of the character as well as other comic antagonists: she is shown as a victim, but still as a dangerous and uncontrolled force, making how deal with her a moral conundrum for the team of the titular hero.

Reviewer Rachel Paige commented on the impact of Plastique's changing backstory: she found the idea from the comics, that the character got her supernatural explosive abilities by "some handy genetic engineering" terrifying, but getting her powers from the S.T.A.R. Labs explosion like the Flash from the TV series only mildly so.

Brent Frankenhoff included Plastique in his list of Comics' Sexiest Bad Girls'' due to the accentuated depiction of her body, while the character was still portrayed with a sense of shame when unclad in public.

References

External links
 DCU Guide: Fury of Firestorm #7
 DCU Guide: Captain Atom #8

DC Comics female superheroes
DC Comics female supervillains
DC Comics superheroes
DC Comics supervillains
DC Comics metahumans
Comics characters introduced in 1982
Characters created by Gerry Conway
Characters created by Pat Broderick
Suicide Squad members
Fictional Canadian people